Events from the year 1985 in Ireland.

Incumbents
 President: Patrick Hillery
 Taoiseach: Garret FitzGerald (FG)
 Tánaiste: Dick Spring (Lab)
 Minister for Finance: Alan Dukes (FG) 
 Chief Justice:
 Tom O'Higgins (until 1 October 1985)
 Thomas Finlay (from 10 October 1985)
 Dáil: 24th
 Seanad: 17th

Events
 1 January – Cork celebrated 800 years as a chartered city.
 26 February – Former minister Desmond O'Malley was expelled from the Fianna Fáil Party.
 28 February – 1985 Newry mortar attack: the Provisional Irish Republican Army (IRA) killed nine Royal Ulster Constabulary officers in a mortar attack at their station in Newry.
 4 March – Singer Bob Geldof was honoured for his overseas aid efforts at a civic reception in the Mansion House in Dublin.
 12 March – The Health (Family Planning) (Amendment) Act allowed the sale of condoms and spermicides to adults without prescriptions.
 28 March – Gaisce – The President's Award was created by a trust deed under the patronage of the President of Ireland.
 30 March – The Ireland national rugby union team won the Triple Crown and Five Nations Championship at Lansdowne Road stadium in Dublin. They beat England 13–10.
 28 April – Dennis Taylor won the Embassy World Snooker Championship.
 16 May – The Minister for Education, Gemma Hussey, announced a new £20 million project to create a transition year in post-primary schools.
 23 June – Three hundred and twenty nine people were killed when Air India Flight 182 (a Boeing 747) crashed into the sea 190 kilometres southwest of Ireland while flying from Montreal in Canada as the result of a bomb thought to have been planted by the Khalistan movement.
25 June – Irish police foiled an IRA-sponsored "mainland" (England) bombing campaign which targeted London and English seaside resorts.
13 July – The international Live Aid charity rock concert took place in Wembley Stadium, London. It was organised by Irishman Bob Geldof, and Ireland was the highest per-capita donor country.
 22 July – Two women claimed to have seen a statue of the Virgin Mary moving in Ballinspittle, County Cork. The grotto became a pilgrimage site and thousands visited there on 31 July.
 25 July – Ireland was struck by a violent thunderstorm, one of the worst in the country's history.
 2 September – Spike Island Jail in County Cork was left in ruins following a riot by prisoners.
 10 September – The first heart transplant in Ireland was performed.
 20 September – President Hillery presented Bob Geldof with a cheque for £7 million as the Irish contribution to the Live Aid appeal.
 29 September – Pleasure trawler Taurima, owned by Charles Haughey, was wrecked near Mizen Head lighthouse.
 11 October – Shop steward Karen Gearon, representing striking workers at Dunnes Stores, addressed the United Nations Special Committee against Apartheid on a Day of Solidarity with South African Political Prisoners.
 25 October – The first commercial flight departed from the new Knock Airport.
 15 November – Taoiseach, Garret FitzGerald, and the Prime Minister of the United Kingdom, Margaret Thatcher, signed the Anglo-Irish Agreement at   Castle.
27 November – Mary Harney was expelled from the Fianna Fáil parliamentary party due to her support of the Anglo-Irish Agreement.
 21 December – Desmond O'Malley founded the Progressive Democrats party.

Arts and literature
 18 February – Frank McGuinness's play Observe the Sons of Ulster Marching Towards the Somme opened on the Peacock Stage of the Abbey Theatre in Dublin, winning the Rooney Prize for Irish Literature.
 1 June – Bruce Springsteen and the E Street Band played their debut Irish concert at Slane Castle in front of 100,000 people, and performed for four hours. 
 29 June – The first Croke Park concert took place, featuring U2, Squeeze, R.E.M., The Alarm and In Tua Nua.
 Maeve Binchy's novel Echoes was published.
 Shaun Davey's orchestral suite for voice and uilleann pipes Granuaile was recorded.
 Tom Murphy's  Conversations on a Homecoming (16 April) and Bailegangaire (5 December) were produced by the Druid Theatre Company in Galway.
 Alternative rock group Toasted Heretic was founded by Julian Gough in Galway.

Sport

Association football
Derry City F.C. joined the League of Ireland, having been out of senior football since 1972. Monaghan United F.C. was also elected to the League this year.

Boxing
8 June – Barry McGuigan won the WBA world featherweight boxing championship.

Golf
 The Irish Open was won by Seve Ballesteros (Spain).

Rugby Union
 30 March – The Irish rugby team won the Triple Crown and Five Nations Championship at Lansdowne Road stadium. They beat England 13–10.

Births
11 January – Mark Yeates, soccer player.
13 January – Pat Flynn, soccer player.
20 January – Neil Gallagher, soccer player.
31 January – James "Cha" Fitzpatrick, Kilkenny hurler.
6 February – John Tennyson, Kilkenny hurler.
7 February – Michael Lyng, Cavan Gaelic footballer.
20 February – Alan O'Brien, soccer player.
28 February – Michael Fennelly, Kilkenny hurler.
2 April – Barry Corr, soccer player.
10 April – Willo Flood, soccer player.
23 April – Gary Mulligan, soccer player.
29 April – Pamela Myers, artist.
4 May – Laura Whitmore, presenter.
13 May – David Bell, soccer player.
8 June – Barry Murphy, soccer player.
15 June – Nadine Coyle, singer 
6 July – Killian Scott, actor
10 July – Conan Byrne, soccer player.
17 July – Eoin Larkin, Kilkenny hurler.
22 July – Ryan Dolan, singer
28 July – Darren Murphy, Irish footballer
9 September – Tadhg Purcell, soccer player.
17 September – Brendan Clarke, soccer player.
20 September – George McMahon, actor.
2 October – Mark Quigley, soccer player.
6 October – Karl Bermingham, soccer player.
5 November – Ian Maher, soccer player.
4 December – Stephen Dawson, soccer player.
4 December – Richie Power, Kilkenny hurler.
9 December – Mark Leech, soccer player.
24 December – Donnacha Cody, Kilkenny hurler.
29 December – Patrick Kavanagh, soccer player.

Full date unknown
Deirdre Delaney, camogie player.
Caoilinn Hughes, novelist.

Deaths
18 January – Wilfrid Brambell, actor (born 1912).
21 February – Dermot Ryan, Roman Catholic Archbishop of Dublin (born 1924).
3 March – Noel Purcell, actor (born 1900).
14 March – Kathleen Lemass, wife of Seán Lemass (born 1898).
May – Tommy Murphy, Laois Gaelic footballer (born 1921).
16 June – Alexis FitzGerald Snr, solicitor, Fine Gael Seanad member (born 1916).
17 June – Bernard Bergin, cricketer (born 1913).
29 September – Timothy McAuliffe, Labour Party politician (born 1909).
11 October – Todd Andrews, Irish revolutionary and public servant (born 1901).
4 November – Liam Grainger, Gaelic footballer (Dohenys, Clonakilty, Carbery, Cork senior team, Munster) (born 1913).
4 December – Frederick Boland, diplomat, first Irish ambassador to Britain and to the United Nations (born 1904).
8 December – Jimmy Rudd, soccer player (born 1919).
11 December – Kathleen Ryan, actress (born 1922).
17 December – Leo Maguire, singer, songwriter and radio broadcaster (born 1903).

Full date unknown
Sigerson Clifford, poet and playwright (born 1913).
Fergus Crawford, soccer player (born 1933).
Alex Stevenson, soccer player (born 1912).

See also
1985 in Irish television

References

 
1980s in Ireland
Years of the 20th century in Ireland
Ireland